Veede ( Him) is a 2003 Indian Telugu-language action film directed by Ravi Raja Pinisetty. This film stars Ravi Teja, Arti Agarwal, Reema Sen, and Sayaji Shinde. The film is a remake of Tamil movie Dhool (2003). Sayaji Shinde, Reema Sen, Manoj K. Jayan, and Pasupathy reprise their roles from the original while Telangana Shakuntala plays a different role in the film.

Plot

Yedukondalu (Ravi Teja) is an uneducated, head strong youth in Bobbarlanka village. He and his village heads decide to close down the nearby factory by appealing to politicians as its letting out a lot of pollutants into the river which is the main source of food, water and livelihood for them. He and another girl Mangatayaru (Aarti Agarwal) are sent to Hyderabad to appeal to MLA of their constituency - Byragi Naidu (Sayaji Shinde). They stay at a friend's place, (Ali's house) and try to get their work done by the minister. In the process many hurdles come across them. Yedukondalu roughs up a few of the MLA's goons and is always at loggerheads with his henchmen. After all this, Byragi Naidu begins to show his true colors and plans to butcher Edu Kondalu as he is forming as an obstruction to his underground activities, unknowingly. Then, the protagonist of the story decides to teach the MLA a lesson, get his job done of closing down the factory. Swapna (Reema Sen) is a journalist who stays in Yedukondalu's locality and has a heavy crush on him. She also helps him in pinning down the minister. The remaining plot is how intelligently Yedukondalu outclasses the minister and earns good name. Also in the plot, the hero makes use of Shakeela's films to defame the minister and she herself makes an appearance in the film.

Cast

Production 
The film's name was suggested by Puri Jagannadh. The film was shot in Mysore, Chikmagalur and Nekkad.

Soundtrack

The music is composed by Chakri and released by Supreme. The song "Ammadi Yamma Yammare" was borrowed from the Tamil original. Lyrics by Bhaskarabhatla Ravikumar, Sahiti, and Suddala Ashokteja.

Release 
The Hindu opined that the film is "worth watching". Sify said that " Veede is a one-man show for Ravi Teja". Full Hyderabad gave the film a rating of seven-and-a-half out of ten. Idlebrain gave the film a rating of three-and-a-quarter out of five.

References

External links 
 

2000s Telugu-language films
2003 films
Telugu remakes of Tamil films
2003 action drama films
Indian action drama films
2000s masala films
Films directed by Ravi Raja Pinisetty
Films scored by Chakri